Tarpan (Equus ferus ferus) is an extinct Eurasian wild horse.

Tarpan may also refer to:

Equine animals
 Historically, Wild horse (Equus ferus)
 Historically, any horse sharing the grullo color of Equus ferus ferus
 Heck horse, a breed of domestic horses selected to resemble Equus ferus ferus

Other
 Tarpana or Tarpan, a term in the Vedic practice which refers to an offering made to divine entities
 Tarpan (film) (The Absolution) 1994 Hindi film, starring Om Puri and Revathy
 FSR Tarpan, a Polish light truck manufacturer
 Tarpan Honker, a kind of vehicle
 PZL M-4 Tarpan, an aircraft
 ST Tarpan, a tugboat

See also
Tarpon (disambiguation)